James Wilkinson (1757–1825) was a U.S. Army general. General Wilkinson may also refer to:

Frederick Green Wilkinson (1825–1913), British Army lieutenant general
Henry Clement Wilkinson (1837–1908), British Army lieutenant general
Percival Spearman Wilkinson (1865–1953), British Army major general
W. Wilkinson (fl. 1810s), British Army major general

See also
Attorney General Wilkinson (disambiguation)